Semisulcospira gottschei is a species of freshwater snail with an operculum, an aquatic gastropod mollusk in the family Semisulcospiridae.

The specific name gottschei is in honor of German geologist Carl Christian Gottsche, who collected type specimen during his research in Korea in 1884.

Distribution 
This species occurs in the South Korea. The type locality is Han River in Seoul.

Ecology
Semisulcospira gottschei serves as the first intermediate host for Paragonimus westermani.

References

External links

 Kim W.-J., Kim D.-H., Lee J.-S., Bang I.-C., Lee W.-O. & Jung H. (2010). "Systematic Relationships of Korean Freshwater Snails of Semisulcospira, Koreanomelania, and Koreoleptoxis (Cerithiodiea; Pleuroceridae) Revealed by Mitochondrial Cytochrome Oxidase I Sequences". Korean Journal of Malacology 26(4): 275-283. abstract and PDF.

Semisulcospiridae